Lucas Alejandro Martínez Guanco (born 5 November 1998) is a Uruguayan footballer who plays as a midfielder for Defensor Sporting B.

Career

Juventud
In January 2019, Martínez was loaned out to Juventud. He made his debut in the opening match of the season on 16 February, coming on as an 86th-minute substitute for Diego García in a 2-1 defeat to Fénix. He would make a total of 12 appearances during his loan spell before returning to Defensor Sporting.

Career statistics

Club

References

1998 births
Living people
Juventud de Las Piedras players
Uruguayan Primera División players
Uruguayan footballers
Association football midfielders
People from Durazno